Van Doorn is a toponymic surname of Dutch origin. The original carrier of the name may have been associated with the towns Doorn, Utrecht or Deurne, North Brabant or with a farm, homestead or other place named De(n) Doorn (="the thorn(bush)"). Variations of the name include Van Dooren, Doorn, Van Doorne, Van Doren, Van Dorin and Van Dorn.

People with the name Doorn, Van Doorn, Van Doorne, or Vandoorne  include:

Van Doorn
 Annita van Doorn (b. 1983), Dutch short track speed skater 
 Arnoud van Doorn (b. 1966), Dutch far right politician
 Cornelis Johannes van Doorn (1837–1906), Dutch engineer and foreign advisor in Japan
 Daniel Jansen Van Doorn (b. 1990), Canadian volleyball player
 Donij van Doorn, Dutch soprano touring with André Rieu
 Harry van Doorn (1915–1992), Dutch politician and government minister
 Herman van Doorn (b. 1963), Dutch jazz and pop singer
  (1925–2008), Dutch sociologist and columnist
 Johnny van Doorn (1944–1991), Dutch writer, poet, and performer
 Marieke van Doorn (b. 1960), Dutch field hockey player
 Peter van Doorn (b. 1946), Dutch racing cyclist
 Sander van Doorn (b. 1979), Dutch musician, DJ, and producer
 Tinus van Doorn (1905–1940), Dutch Expressionist painter and graphic artist
Van Doorne / Vandoorne
 Hub van Doorne (1900–1979), Dutch businessman, co-founder of the DAF car manufacturing company
 Stoffel Vandoorne (b. 1992), Belgian racing driver
Doorn
 Bert Doorn (b. 1949), Dutch politician
 Tiffany Doorn (b. 1982), American beauty queen

 Van Dorn
 Earl Van Dorn (1820–1863), Confederate officer
 Peter Aaron Van Dorn (1773-1837), one of the founders of the city of Jackson, Mississippi

See also
 Van Dooren
 Van Doren
 Van Dorn
 Van Doorne transmission, developed by Hub van Doorne

References

Dutch-language surnames
Surnames of Dutch origin
Toponymic surnames